Mossie Guttormsen (29 July 1916 – 8 August 1998) was an Australian cricketer. He played in four first-class matches for Queensland between 1936 and 1939.

See also
 List of Queensland first-class cricketers

References

External links
 

1916 births
1998 deaths
Australian cricketers
Queensland cricketers
Cricketers from Brisbane